Mónika González is an opera singer born in Italy.

Gonzalez graduated from the Franz Liszt Music Academy in Budapest, Hungary as choir conductor, pianist, and opera singer. Winner of the international "Toti dal Monte" Singing Competition. She made her debut in Italy with Peter Maag in Mozart’s Figaro.

By the personal invitation of Dame Joan Sutherland and Richard Bonynge, Gonzalez studied at their home in Montreux, and prepared a special recital put together by them.

She sings regularly in Italy, for example in the Teatro dell’Opera di Roma, the Teatro Massimo di Palermo, etc. She also sings opera productions in France, Germany, Austria, gives concerts in Italy, the U.K., Poland, Germany, the Czech Republic, and the Sultanate of Oman and Japan. Gonzalez is a member of the Hungarian State Opera and the Budapest Chamber Opera where she sings Violetta, Donna Anna, Vitellia, Contessa, Pamina, Norina, and Poppea, etc.

Gonzalez worked together with conductors such as Georges Prêtre, Iván Fischer, Gianluigi Gelmetti, Ervin Lukács, Sigiswald Kuijken, Will Humburg, W. Gönnenwein, and with directors as Gianfranco de Bosio, Pierluigi Pizzi, etc.

In 2004, she was awarded the Franz Liszt State Prize by the Government of Hungary. In the 2005 Budapest Spring Festival, she made her debut in the title role of Haendel’s Semele. In 2006, she sang the role of Eva in Die Meistersinger von Nürnberg in the new production of the Hungarian State Opera House, led by Yuri Simonov.

Gonzalez presently lives in Budapest, Hungary.

Recordings
She has made an Italian videofilm production (UNESCO) of Verdi’s La traviata as Violetta directed by Gianfranco de Bosio. There is also a CD recording with the SWR Stuttgart Symphony Orchestra on Hungaroton, Forlain, Bongiovanni.

References

Living people
Italian operatic sopranos
Musicians from Budapest
Year of birth missing (living people)